No Man's Land is a crossroads hamlet in south-east Cornwall, England, United Kingdom. It is situated approximately two miles (3 km) northeast of Looe on the B3253 road to Widegates.

Morval Vintage Steam Rally, an annual weekend event which raises funds for local charities, takes place at Bray Farm in No Man's Land

References

Hamlets in Cornwall